Diphenylsilanediol, Ph2Si(OH)2, is a silanol. The tetrahedral molecule forms hydrogen-bonded columns in the solid state. It can be prepared by hydrolysis of diphenyldichlorosilane Ph2SiCl2. Diphenylsilanediol can act as an anticonvulsant, in a similar way to phenytoin. Although the compound is stable in normal conditions, the presence of basic impurities can accelerate the condensation of the silanol groups.

References

Silanols
Organosilicon compounds
Phenyl compounds